Toxocara vitulorum is a species of nematode belonging to the family Toxocaridae.

The species has cosmopolitan distribution.

References

Ascaridida